Obed Ngaite (born 9 July 1967) is a former cyclist from the Central African Republic. He competed in two events at the 1992 Summer Olympics.

References

External links
 

1967 births
Living people
Central African Republic male cyclists
Olympic cyclists of the Central African Republic
Cyclists at the 1992 Summer Olympics
Place of birth missing (living people)